Maddiston is a village in the Falkirk council area of Scotland.

Population
Based on the United Kingdom 2001 census, Falkirk council reported the population of Maddiston as being 2,952 residents, a 40% rise since 1991. The subsequent census in 2011 reported the population as 3,099, an increase of 174 residents (5.9%).

History
Maddiston (historically Maudirstoun) is in the parish of Muiravonside and its first known reference is in documents in the fifteenth century.

See also
Falkirk Braes villages
List of places in Falkirk council area

References

Villages in Falkirk (council area)